Colin Armstrong  (born 1961), usually known by the pen-name Chris Ryan, is a British author, television presenter, security consultant and former Special Air Service sergeant.

After the publication of fellow patrol member Andy McNab's Bravo Two Zero in 1993, Ryan published his own account of his experiences during the Bravo Two Zero mission in 1995, entitled The One That Got Away. 
Since retiring from the British Army Ryan has published several fiction and non-fiction books, including Strike Back, which was subsequently adapted into a television series for Sky 1, and co-created the ITV action series Ultimate Force. He has also presented or appeared in numerous television documentaries connected to the military or law enforcement.

Early life, education and military service
Ryan was born in Rowlands Gill in County Durham. After attending Hookergate School, he enrolled in the British Army at the age of 16. Ryan's cousin was a member of the reservist 23 SAS Regiment and invited Ryan to come up and "see what it's like to be in the army". Ryan did this nearly every weekend, almost passing selection several times, but he was too young to continue and do 'test week'. When he was old enough, he passed selection into 23 SAS. Shortly after that he began selection for the regular 22 SAS Regiment and joined 'B' Squadron as a medic. Needing a parent regiment, Ryan and a soldier who had joined 22 SAS from the Royal Navy, spent eight weeks with the Parachute Regiment before returning to 'B' Squadron.

Bravo Two Zero

During the Gulf War, Ryan was a team member of the ill-fated eight-man  SAS patrol, with the call sign Bravo Two Zero. The patrol was sent into Iraq to "gather intelligence,... find a good LUP (lying up position) and set up an OP" on the main supply route (MSR) between Baghdad and North-Western Iraq, and eventually take out the Scud TELs. 

However they were compromised and forced to head towards Syria on foot. Ryan walked , from an observation point on the Iraqi MSR between Baghdad and North-Western Iraq, to the Syrian Border. This march made SAS history as the "longest escape and evasion by an SAS trooper or any other soldier", covering  more than SAS trooper Jack Sillito had in the Sahara Desert in 1942.

During his escape, Ryan suffered injuries from drinking water contaminated with nuclear waste. Besides suffering severe muscle atrophy, he lost  and did not return to operational duties. Instead, he selected and trained potential recruits, before being honourably discharged from the SAS in 1994. 

On 29 June 1991 Ryan was awarded the Military Medal "in recognition of gallant and distinguished services in the Gulf in 1991" although the award was not gazetted until 15 December 1998 together with the equally delayed announcement of Andy McNab's Distinguished Conduct Medal.

Post-military career
After leaving the SAS, Ryan wrote The One That Got Away, which covers the account from his patrol report of the Bravo Two Zero mission. Both his and McNab's accounts have been heavily criticised by former territorial SAS member and explorer Michael Asher, who attempted to retrace the patrol's footsteps for TV and claimed to have debunked both accounts with the help of the then-SAS regimental sergeant major Peter Ratcliffe.

Ryan has written more than 70 books, both fiction and non-fiction. Many of his works are well known, such as fictional works like Strike Back (2007), which was adapted into the TV show, and Firefight (September 2008). He also writes fictional books for teenage readers, including the Alpha Force Series and "Code Red", and has written a romantic novel, The Fisherman's Daughter, under the pseudonym Molly Jackson.

In addition to his writing Ryan has contributed to several television series and video games. In 2002 Ryan co-created and appeared in ITV's action series, Ultimate Force, playing the role of Blue Troop leader Staff Sergeant Johnny Bell in the first series. He acted as a military adviser for the video game I.G.I.-2: Covert Strike. 

Ryan was the star of BBC One's Hunting Chris Ryan in 2003 which later aired on the Military Channel as 'Special Forces Manhunt'. In 2004 Ryan produced several programmes titled Terror Alert: Could You Survive, demonstrating how to survive disasters including flooding, nuclear terrorist attack, mass blackouts, and plane hijackings. In 2005, Ryan presented a Sky One show called How Not to Die, detailing how to survive various life-threatening situations. In 2007 Ryan trained and managed a six-man team to represent Team GB at Sure for Men's Extreme Pamplona Chase in Spain during the Running of the Bulls and also appeared in an episode of the Derren Brown series, Mind Control with Derren Brown, where he booby-trapped a course for Brown to follow whilst blindfolded. Ryan presented the television series Elite World Cops, also broadcast as Armed and Dangerous, which aired on Bravo in 2008. In the show, Ryan spends time with law enforcement agencies around the world.

Personal life
Ryan has a daughter. His experiences in Iraq caused him to suffer from post traumatic stress disorder. Following his consumption of radioactive water during his Bravo Two Zero escape, he was warned not to have any children in the future.

Books
Ryan has written the following books:

Non-fiction
 The One That Got Away (1995)
 Chris Ryan's SAS Fitness Book (1999)
 Chris Ryan's Ultimate Survival Guide (2003)
 Fight to Win: Deadly Skills of the Elite Forces (2009)
 Safe: How To Stay Safe in a Dangerous World (2017)
 The History of the SAS (2019)

Fiction
Agent 21
 Agent 21 (2010)
 Reloaded (2012)
 Codebreaker (2013)
 Deadfall (2014)
 Under Cover (2015)
 Endgame (2016)

Alpha Force
 Survival (2002)
 Rat-catcher (2002)
 Desert Pursuit (2003)
 Hostage (2003)
 Red Centre (2004)
 Hunted (2004)
 Blood Money (2005)
 Fault Line (2005)
 Black Gold (2005)
 Untouchable (2005)

Code Red
 Flash Flood (2006)
 Wildfire (2007)
 Outbreak (2007)
 Vortex (2008)
 Twister (2008)
 Battleground (2009)

Danny Black
 Masters of War (2013)
 Hunter Killer (2014)
 Hellfire (2015)
 Bad Soldier (2016)
 Warlord (2017)
 Head Hunters (2018)
 Black Ops (2019)
 Zero 22 (2020)

Extreme
 Hard Target (2012)
 Night Strike (2013)
 Most Wanted (2014)
 Silent Kill (2015)

Geordie Sharp
 Stand By, Stand By (1996)
 Zero Option (1997) The Kremlin Device (1998)
 Tenth Man Down (1999)

Josh Bowman
 Manhunter (2021)

Matt Browning
 Greed (2003)
 The Increment (2004)

Special Forces Cadets
 Siege (2018)
 Missing (2019)
 Justice (2019)
 Ruthless (2020)
 Hijack (2020)
 Assassin (2021)

Strike Back
 Strike Back (2007)Series is prequel to the novel "Strike Back" (2007) Deathlist (2016)
 Shadow Kill (2017)
 Global Strike (2018)
 Red Strike (2019)
 Circle of Death (2020)

Quick Reads
 One Good Turn (2008)

Other
 The Hit List (2000)
 The Watchman (2001)
 Land of Fire (2002)
 Blackout (2005)
 Ultimate Weapon (2006)
 Firefight (2008)
 The Fisherman's Daughter (2009) (as Molly Jackson)
 Who Dares Wins (2009)
 The Kill Zone (2010)
 Medal of Honor (2010)
 Killing for the Company (2011)
 Osama (2012)
 Outcast (2022)

Filmography 
 Ultimate Force (2002) - SSgt Johnny Bell
 Hunting Chris Ryan (2003) - Himself
 Elite World Cops (2008) - Himself 
 Chris Ryan's Strike Back (2010) - Commanding Officer

References

External links
Official Facebook page
Official Website

 Chris Ryan's Elite Police DVD release
 List of books
 Chris Ryan audio interview, November 2008 with Scottish Book Trust
 Chris Ryan's Strike Back on Sky 1
 Chris Ryan's Strike Back Video Trailer

Special Air Service soldiers
Recipients of the Military Medal
20th-century British novelists
21st-century British novelists
British non-fiction writers
Historians of espionage
British Army personnel of the Gulf War
British Parachute Regiment soldiers
People from Rowlands Gill
1961 births
Living people
British male novelists
20th-century British male writers
21st-century British male writers
20th-century non-fiction writers
Male non-fiction writers